Budaiya Club is a football club based in Budaiya, Bahrain, that competes in the Bahraini Premier League. They play their home games at the Hamad Town Stadium, and their home kit is green with white details.

History 
Having won the 2017–18 Bahraini Second Division, Budaiya were promoted to the Bahraini Premier League after a 10-year absence from the competition. In 2018–19, they finished in 9th place, and were relegated back to the Second Division. Budaiya finished in second place, and were promoted to the Premier League for the 2020–21 season.

Players

2020 squad

Honours 
 Bahraini Second Division
 Winners (1): 2017–18

References

Football clubs in Bahrain